Logan Miller (born October 31, 1992) is an American soccer player who most recently played for Wilmington Hammerheads in the USL.

Career

College
Miller began his college career at Regis University in 2011, before transferring to University of Central Arkansas in 2013.

Professional
After college, Miller played with Premier Development League side Kitsap Pumas for their 2015 season.

Miller signed with United Soccer League side Wilmington Hammerheads on January 7, 2016.

References

External links
 

1992 births
Living people
Regis Rangers men's soccer players
Central Arkansas Bears soccer players
Kitsap Pumas players
Wilmington Hammerheads FC players
Association football midfielders
Soccer players from Texas
USL League Two players
USL Championship players
Soccer players from Colorado
American soccer players